Dankuni is a city and a municipality of Hooghly district in the Indian state of West Bengal. It is now part of the area covered by Kolkata Metropolitan Development Authority (KMDA). It is considered posh area in Hooghly. It had an estimated population of 249,840 at the 2011 census. It has a suburban station on the Calcutta Chord link line of the Kolkata Suburban Railway.

Geography

Location

Kharsarai, Tisa, Kapashanria, Jaykrishnapur, Purba Tajpur, Begampur, Baksa, Panchghara, Chikrand, Janai, Pairagachha, Naiti, Barijhati, Garalgachha and Krishnapur, all the census towns form a series from the northern part of Chanditala II CD Block to its southern part. The only municipality in the area, Dankuni, located outside the CD Block, occupies the south-east corner of the entire cluster.

Police station
Dankuni police station has jurisdiction over Dankuni Municipal area and parts of Dankuni Housing complex police station  and Sreerampur Uttarpara CD Blocks.

Urbanisation
Srirampore subdivision is the most urbanized of the subdivisions in Hooghly district. 73.13% of the population in the subdivision is urban and 26.88% is rural. The subdivision has 6 municipalities and 34 census towns. The municipalities are: Uttarpara Kotrung Municipality, Konnagar Municipality, Serampore Municipality, Baidyabati Municipality, Rishra Municipality and Dankuni Municipality. Amongst the CD Blocks in the subdivision, Uttarapara Serampore (census towns shown in a separate map) had 76% urban population, Chanditala I 42%, Chanditala II 69% and Jangipara 7% (census towns shown in the map above). All places marked in the map are linked in the larger full screen map.

Climate 
City has a tropical climate. When compared with winter, the summers have much more rainfall. According to Köppen and Geiger, this climate is classified as Aw.

Located at an elevation of None meters (0 feet) above sea level, city's yearly temperature is 30.28°C (86.5°F) and it is 4.31% higher than India's averages. Dankuni typically receives about 150.21 millimeters (5.91 inches) of precipitation and has 150.54 rainy days (41.24% of the time) annually.

Demography

Population 
In the 2011 census, Dankuni Urban Agglomeration had a population of 249,840, out of which 128,139 were males and 121,701 were females. The 0–6 years population was 22,956. Effective literacy rate for the 7+ population was 85.69 per cent.

Literacy Rate 
The literacy rate of Dankuni Agglomeration is 84.72% which is lower than National Urban average of 85 %. Literacy rate for male and female for Dankuni stood at 88.10 % and 81.20 % respectively. Total literates in Dankuni UA were 190,629 of which males were 101,141 and remaining 89,488 were females.

Languages 

Bengali is the official language in Dankuni city.

In the city at the time of the 2011 census, 70.12% of the population spoke Bengali, 25.79% Hindi and 2.39% Odia as their first language.

Urban Agglomeration 

As per the 2011 census, Dankuni Urban Agglomeration includes: Dankuni (M), Purba Tajpur (CT), Kharsarai (CT), Begampur (CT), Chikrand (CT), Pairagachha (CT), Barijhati (CT), Garalgachha (CT), Krishnapur (CT), Baruipara (CT), Borai (CT), Nawapara (CT), Basai (CT), Gangadharpur (CT),  Manirampur (CT), Janai (CT), Kapashanria (CT), Jaykrishnapur (CT), Tisa (CT), Baksa (CT), Panchghara (CT) and Naiti (CT).

Economy

Commercial and Industrial activity

Some of the units engaged in commercial and industrial activity in and around Dankuni are:
 Diesel Locomotive Component Factory of the Indian Railways was inaugurated by Mamata Banerjee at Dankuni in 2012. It produces high horse power diesel locomotive underframes. It functions as a sister unit of Banaras Locomotive Works at Varanasi.
 Electric Loco Assembly and Ancillary Unit of Chittaranjan Locomotive Works of Indian Railways at Dankuni has started functioning in 2016.
 The Eastern Dedicated Freight Corridor will have its eastern terminus at Dankuni. The 1,839 km long Eastern Dedicated Freight Corridor from Ludhiana to Dankuni, is part of the total Dedicated Freight Corridor Project, presently with two corridors (western and eastern). The Son Nagar-Dankuni sector of the eastern corridor, will have electrified double line. There is provision for extension of the lines to the proposed deep-sea port in the Kolkata area. The Sonnagar-Dankuni sector is to be implemented through the PPP mode. The eastern corridor will serve primarily the steel and coal sectors. The Government of India approved the project in 2006 at an estimated initial cost of Rs. 28,181 crores. As of 2015, the project is delayed and needs additional sanctions for cost over runs.
 Mother Dairy, Kolkata was set up as a part of Operation Flood launched by the National Dairy Development Board in the 1970s. It covered the 4 metros and all the units were named Mother Dairy. Eventually, NDDB moved out and West Bengal Cooperative Milk Producers Federation took over in 1996. This is separate from the Delhi-based Mother Dairy. Kolkata Mother Dairy’s main plant at Dankuni produces 4.5 lakh litres of milk daily. Apart from milk, it produces dahi, yoghurt, paneer, ghee and drinking water.
 Dankuni Coal Complex, a low temperature carbonisation plant set up by Coal India Limited in the 1980s, and currently operated under lease, by South Eastern Coalfields Limited, at Dankuni, to produces 1,000 MT per day of solid smokeless fuel branded as "CIL Coke™" and 18 million cft per day of coal gas for supply in and around Kolkata and Howrah, through the Greater Calcutta Gas Supply Corporation Limited (A Govt of WB State Undertaking); Tar Chemicals.
 Bhusan Power and Steel started with a cold rolling and galvanising plants in 2001 at Bangihati, Mallickpara, Dankuni and have subsequently expanded.
 Dankuni Poly Chemicals Pvt. Ltd. was incorporated in 1982. It manufactures refined petroleum products.
 Nezone Tubes Ltd., Delhi Road, Village: Chakundi, DCC Township, Dankuni, was established in 2000. It produces galzanised tubes, steel tubes and galvanised pipes.
 Bengal Beverages Pvt. Ltd. was established at Dankuni in 1984. The authorised bottlers of Coca-Cola, its key products include Thumps Up, Sprite, Coca-Cola, Fanta, Limca, Maaza, Kinley Soda and Kinley Water.
 Patco Tech India Private Limited was established at Dankuni in 2007. It manufactures and exports discharge and collecting electrodes and air preheater baskets, used in thermal power and steel industries.
 Vikrant Forge Limited was established at Dankuni in 1985. It manufactures and exports forgings up to 8 tonnes for the power, steel and other industries.
 Anmol Industries (formerly. Anmol Biscuits)., one of the leading biscuit manufacturers, was established in 1993. It produces 8 lakh cartons per month (in 2017). It has   manufacturing units at Dankuni and Noida.
Ifabex Technologies formed in 2012.Engineering company and channel partner for fault tolerant solutions.
. Amazon Warehouse
. Flipkart Warehouse

Township project
Dankuni has two townships. One, the Government Housing Estate, was constructed by the Government of West Bengal and is popularly known as "Dankuni Housing". The other is Dankuni Coal Complex Township of Coal India Limited, known as "Township", for its employees, which was constructed by National Projects Construction Corporation Limited. A large portion of the Dankuni Coal Complex Township is being slowly encroached upon by the West Bengal Police. The Dankuni Coal Complex authorities have given two areas, on a very low rent lease, to Methodist School and Patha Bhavan School, within the township premises.

In addition to this, there was a plan for a new township at Dankuni. The project area covered 20 mouzas (villages) – 5 full and 15 part, spread across four police stations, namely Dankuni, Chanditala, Singur and Serampore. Important railway stations in the project area were Gobra, Janai Road and Begampur, apart from the important station at Dankuni itself, all on the Howrah-Bardhaman chord. Important road corridors cutting across the project area were Durgapur Expressway (NH 19), Delhi Road, Naity Road and  Serampore-Siakhala Road. The Delhi-based DLF, which had entered into an agreement with KMDA for development of the township, withdrew from the project in 2009, primarily because KMDA was unable to procure land.

Transport
Roads

Both NH 19 and NH 16 terminate at Dankuni. The Palsit-Dankuni section of NH 19 (old numbering NH 2) is also referred to as Durgapur Expressway. Other major arteries meeting at Dankuni are Belghoria Expressway connecting to NH 12 (old numbering: NH 34), SH 13/ Dankuni-Mogra Delhi Road and SH 15.           

Dankuni Railway StationDankuni railway station is located on the Howrah-Bardhaman chord line, which was constructed in 1917. It is an important yard of the Howrah division. The Calcutta Chord from Dum Dum to Dankuni over the Willingdon Bridge (renamed Vivekananda Setu) was opened in 1932. It is part of the Kolkata Suburban Railway system. Already, there is a growing presence of freight and wagon movements around Dankuni Railway Station, which is important as it connects Eastern Railway with South Eastern Railway with a link line. Dankuni has a fast-growing freight yard, where goods traffic is moved, sorted and packed to deliver at other destinations.

Kolkata Airport 

Netaji Subhash Chandra Bose International Airport  18.6 km From Dankuni

Metro Railway 

Howrah Maidan To Dankuni Via Shreerampore Metro Purposed

Gallery

Neighborhoods 
Dankuni has many neighborhoods the most notable being Howrah, Uttarpara, Konnagar, Chanditala, Jagadishpur, Serampore and Bally

References

Cities and towns in Hooghly district
Neighbourhoods in Kolkata
Kolkata Metropolitan Area